Chris Dixon is an American internet entrepreneur and investor. He is a general partner at the venture capital firm Andreessen Horowitz, and previously worked at eBay. He is also the co-founder and former CEO of Hunch.  He was #1 on the Midas List in 2022. Dixon is known as a cryptocurrency and Web3 evangelist.

Early life and education
Dixon grew up in Ohio. He earned a BA and an MA from Columbia University, majoring in philosophy, and has an MBA from Harvard Business School. His early college days were at Wesleyan University before he transferred.

Career

Business 
Dixon joined the venture capital firm Bessemer Venture Partners.

In 2005, Dixon co-founded SiteAdvisor, a web-security startup that was bought by security company McAfee in 2006. In 2009, he founded Hunch with Caterina Fake and Tom Pinckney, which was acquired by eBay in 2011.

Andreessen Horowitz
As of 2022, Dixon is a general partner at Andreessen Horowitz, a venture capital firm in Menlo Park, California. After joining the firm in 2012, Dixon led a variety of investments for the firm including FiftyThree, Soylent, and Nootrobox. He sits on the boards of drone startup Airware, and 3D printing startup Shapeways.

Dixon became an early advocate for investments in Bitcoin, which he championed in various blog posts that became  "something of a gospel among young crypto entrepreneurs." By 2014, Andreessen Horowitz had invested almost $50 million into Bitcoin-related endeavors such as the cryptocurrency exchange Coinbase. In 2022, Fortune called Dixon "the world's top crypto investor." In an October 2022 article titled "Andreessen Horowitz Went All In on Crypto at the Worst Possible Time", the Wall Street Journal reported that during the first half of 2022, the cryptocurrency fund founded by Davis at Andreesen Horowitz had lost around 40% of its value, a decline "much larger than the 10% to 20% drops recorded by other venture funds, which have largely avoided the risky practice of purchasing volatile cryptocurrencies."

Dixon also led the firm's investment and sits on the board of Oculus VR.

References

External links
 

American computer businesspeople
American investors
American technology chief executives
American technology company founders
Businesspeople in software
Columbia University School of General Studies alumni
EBay employees
Living people
Private equity and venture capital investors
Harvard Business School alumni
Andreessen Horowitz
People associated with cryptocurrency
Midas List
Year of birth missing (living people)